The 1938 Chicago Cardinals season was their 19th in the league. The team failed to improve on their previous output of 5–5–1, winning only two games. They played seven of their eleven games on the road and failed to qualify for the playoffs for the 13th consecutive season.

Schedule

Standings

References

1938
Chicago Cardinals
Chicago